Miltochrista linga is a moth of the family Erebidae. It was described by Frederic Moore in 1860. It is found in the north-western Himalayas and Sikkim.

References

linga
Moths described in 1860
Moths of Asia